Nelson 'Bill' Hardy (1905–1993) was an Australian rugby league footballer who played in the 1920s and 1930s.

Hardy was playing first grade in the NSWRFL premiership for his side, the Eastern Suburbs club, at just 18 years of age. An accomplished  or  Hardy played 87 matches for Easts in the years 1925–30.

In 1928, Hardy was a member of the Eastern Suburbs side that was defeated by South Sydney in that year's premiership decider. On 22 December 1928 Hardy took place in rugby league first night match, an exhibition match between that year's finalists Easts and Souths.

Hardy played in three tests for the Australia national rugby league team in the 1928 season against a touring Great Britain side and was a representative of New South Wales on 15 occasions throughout his career.

Hardy played out his career in England with the Warrington Wolves club. However, when he returned to Australia, he played as captain coach of Cessnock, New South Wales in 1935. He then came back to Sydney and moved to the St. George District and had one season at the St. George Dragons in 1936, but injuries ended his final season early.

Hardy's sons Kevin and Don played first grade for Eastern Suburbs while his grandson, Steve, was an Australian schoolboy rugby league representative who played for both the Cronulla-Sutherland and Eastern Suburbs clubs.

A glazier by trade Hardy was aged 87 at the time of his death in 1993.

References

Sources
Whiticker, Alan & Hudson, Glen (2006) The Encyclopedia of Rugby League Players, Gavin Allen Publishing, Sydney
 (David Middleton), Rugby League Yearbook

1905 births
1993 deaths
Australian rugby league coaches
Australian rugby league players
New South Wales rugby league team players
City New South Wales rugby league team players
Sydney Roosters players
St. George Dragons players
Australia national rugby league team players
Warrington Wolves players
Rugby league centres
Rugby league fullbacks